Lilford Park may refer to:

Lilford Park (Northamptonshire) associated with Lilford Hall, near Oundle
Lilford Park (Lancashire) associated with Atherton Hall, Leigh